Watertown High School may refer to:

Watertown High School (Connecticut) in Watertown, Connecticut
Watertown High School (Massachusetts) in Watertown, Massachusetts
Watertown High School (New York) in Watertown, New York
Watertown High School (South Dakota) in Watertown, South Dakota
Watertown High School (Tennessee) in Watertown, Tennessee
Watertown High School (Wisconsin) in Watertown, Wisconsin